Isuru Lokuhettiarachchi (born 23 March 1983), is an actor in Sri Lankan cinema and television.

Personal life
He was born on 23 March 1983 in Matara, Sri Lanka as the youngest child of the family. He completed education from Rahula College, Matara. He has one elder brother.

Before entering drama, he worked in Sri Lanka Army. He worked as a second lieutenant in Army from 2003 to 2007. His first working station was Ariyalei in Jaffna during Eelam War. Then he worked at Naagadeepa, Kilali, Sarasale, Eluthumadduval and Muhamalai army bases. After quit from army, he worked as a manager in the pharmaceutical marketing industry. In 2013, he completed the degree on Drama and Theater from University of Drama.

He has been dated fellow actress and model Tharindi Fernando since 2018. They got engaged in 2020.

Career
After quit from army, he acted in few teledramas and stage dramas in uncredited roles. His maiden television acting came through Dennata Denna directed by Charith Kothalawala in 2008. But in that drama, only his back side was visible. He acted as a reality show watcher and was wearing a t-shirt with a number on it. That's the number he was able to recognize as his back. In 2012, he acted in first supportive role in the popular drama Malee  as "Piyarathna" .

He is also a popular dubbing artist, that rendered his voice for many dubbed television serials, including Boys Over Flowers, Pruthuvi Maharaja, Adjiraja Dharmashoka, Ananthayen Aaa Tharu Kumara, Blacklist and Me Adarayay.

His maiden cinema acting came through 2017 film Ran Sayura with a villain role. His most notable films include Nidahase Piya DS, Husma and President Super Star. His role as "Ruwan" in Husma was highly praised by critics. In 2020 his role 'Narada' became very popular due to his Southern Sinhala accent in the serial Sanda Hangila.

He hosted the television musical program 7 notes and Siyatha Voice Of Asia telecast by Siyatha TV. In 2020 he appeared in dual roles in the television serial Hoda Wade.

Selected television serials

 Aathma
 Aeya as Mayantha / Ryan
 Ahimi as Jagath
 Alu as Nisal
 Angana as Sampath  
 Anguru Siththam
 Api Api Wage - Minor Role
 Awith Maawa Hambawenna 
 Bambara Asapuwa
 BLACKPOOL
 Bonchi Gedara Indrajala
 Colomba Api Awa
 Dadakeli Arana as Migara
 Deweni Wedikaawa
 Dhawala Hasthiya
 Dedunnai Adare as Danushka
 Divi Diyamba
 Diyaniyo as Shelton
 Duvili Sulanga
 Doowaru as Kodikara
 Eka Rene Kurullo
 Gemunu Maharaja as Nandimitra
 Gini Avi Saha Gini Keli as Peter
 Haras Para
 HeartCart
 Honda Wade as Narada / Madhava
 Husmak Tharamata
 Iru Deva
 Kalu Araliya as Mahesh (left because of an accident)
 Konkala Doni as Amantha
 Kumbhira Horawa
 Loku Appachchi
 Maada Numbamai
 Malee 1, 2 as Piyarathna
 Mayavi
 Meedum Amma
 Minigandela as David
 Muthu Kirilli 
 Muthu Palasa
 No Parking as Sanjeewa
 Oba Nisa as Thenuka
 Nannaththara 
 Nirasha as Devid
 Nil Nethu
 Pera Maduwa as Sera
 Paththini
 Pulingu as Sumedha
 Paara as Kalum
 Pehesara as Dilmin
 Pini as Sampatha
 Pork Veediya as Wangeesa 
 Rahai Jeewithe
 Ravana Season 1, 2 as King Kuwera
 Ridee Huya
 Roda Thune Manamali as Senaka 
 Ruwan Maliga - Minor Role
 Sabba Sakala Mana 
 Sanhinda Pamula as Samath
 Salmal Aramaya as Satharasinghe 
 Sanda Hangila as Narada
 See Raja as Budal 
 Sihina Genena Kumariye as Jagath Wickramabahu
 Sihinayata Man Adarei
 Sooriya Wachchasa
 Sudu Kaputo
 Samanalun Piyaabai
 Samanalunta Enna Kiyanna
 Sayuri
 Sansaara
 Saraa 
 Sihina Puraya
 Swetha Gantheera as Maithree
 Visi Eka 
 Wathsunu as Adhithya
 Yakada Kahawanu as Sameera

Filmography

Other careers

Songs
Ahasa Didulana ("Sihina Genena Kumariye" Teledrama)
Duwe Nuba Danne Nathida ("Sihina Genena Kumariye" Teledrama)
Sinidu Wadan Hinga Wuwata ("Sihina Genena Kumariye" Teledrama)

As TV Host/Presenter
7 notes (Siyatha TV) 2018-2020
Voice of Asia 2020 (Siyatha TV) 2019-2020

As Dubbing Artist
 Boys over flowers: (Gu Jun Piyo) - TV Derana
 The Heirs : (Kim Tan) - TV Derana
 Adhiraja Dharmashoka: (Prince Justine) - TV Derana
 Ananthayen A Tharu Kumara: (Haw Kyon) - Sirasa TV
 Kirilliyo - Jathika Rupavahini
 Me Adarayai - Sirasa TV
 Black list - TV 1
 Pruthuvi Maharaja - TV Derana
 Ruvathi Sithaththi(True beauty) - Jathika Rupavahini

As Voice Actor in Radio Dramas
 Seya - Hiru FM
 Samanali - Neth FM

As Music Video Actor
 Pem sihine thani wunu
 Puluwanda dura yanna
 Me pem sitha pura
 Ra ahase
 Godak adarei
 Me susum kagedo
 Waa diya pema

References

External links
 The Life Story Of Isuru Loku Hettiarachchi
 මිහිරගේ නඩුව සමතයකට
 අවංක ආදරේ හම්බුණා – ඉසුරු ලොකුහෙට්ටිආරච්චි
 රඟපාන්න පුළුවන් නිළියන්ට නිරුවත් වෙන්න බැරි නම් වැඩක් නෑ

Sri Lankan male film actors
Living people
Sinhalese male actors
1983 births
Alumni of Rahula College